is the debut album of Japanese idol girl group Nogizaka46. It was released on January 7, 2015. It reached the number-one place on the weekly Oricon Albums Chart, with 222,000 copies. It also reached the number-one place on the Billboard Japan Hot 100. In January 2015, the album was certified Platinum by the Recording Industry Association of Japan.

Release
It was released in 3 editions, Type-A, Type-B and Type-C. Type-A includes two audio CDs and a DVD with 60 minutes live music video Nogizaka46 Summer National Tour 2013 Final! at Yoyogi National 1st Gymnasium. Type-B contains two audio CDs. Type-C has just one CD that includes the title song from 1st to 10th single and four new songs. The album cover photo was taken at Tokyo Metro Nogizaka Station.

Track listing

Charts

Weekly

Year-end charts

Certifications

References

Further reading

External links
 Discography on Nogizaka46 Official Website

2015 debut albums
Japanese-language songs
Nogizaka46 albums
Nogizaka46 songs